Cornel Mirea (born 20 August 1963) is a Romanian former footballer who played as a midfielder and defender.

Honours
Victoria București
Divizia B: 1984–85
Dinamo București
Divizia A: 1989–90
Steaua București
Cupa României: 1991–92
Argeș Pitești
Divizia B: 1993–94

Notes

References

1963 births
Living people
Romanian footballers
Romania under-21 international footballers
Association football midfielders
Liga I players
Liga II players
Victoria București players
FC Dinamo București players
FC Progresul București players
FC Steaua București players
FC Argeș Pitești players
FC Sportul Studențesc București players
AFC Rocar București players
Footballers from Bucharest